The 2017–18 Liga MX Femenil season was the inaugural season of the top-flight women's football league in Mexico. The season is contested by sixteen teams, being the counterpart women's teams of the men's league, Liga MX. Of the 18 Liga MX clubs, Puebla and Lobos BUAP were the two teams who do not field a women's team.

Format

The Liga MX Femenil season is split into two championships: the Torneo Apertura (or opening tournament) and the Torneo Clausura (or closing tournament). Each in contested in an identical format and includes the same sixteen teams. The Apertura started on July 29, 2017 and ended in November 2017  while the Clausura (or closing tournament) runs from January 5-May 5, 2018.

Teams, stadiums, and personnel
The following sixteen teams are competing this season. Of the 18 Liga MX clubs, Puebla and Lobos BUAP are the two teams who do not field a women's team.

Stadiums and locations

Personnel and kits

Managerial changes

Format
The teams will be divided into two groups of eight, where the best two of each group will advance to the semifinals of the Liguilla.

Torneo Apertura

Regular season

Standings

Table

Group 1

Group 2

Positions by round
The table lists the positions of teams after each week of matches. In order to preserve chronological evolvements, any postponed matches are not included in the round at which they were originally scheduled, but added to the full round they were played immediately afterwards. For example, if a match is scheduled for matchday 8, but then postponed and played between days 11 and 12, it will be added to the standings for day 12.

Results

Top goalscorers
Players sorted first by goals scored, then by last name.

Source: Liga MX Femenil

Hat-tricks

4 Player scored four goals

Best XI

Source: LIGA MX Femenil

Liguilla – Apertura

Bracket

Semifinals
First leg

Second leg

Guadalajara won 6–4 on aggregate

Pachuca won 4–3 on aggregate

Final
First leg

Second leg

Guadalajara won 3–2 on aggregate

Torneo Clausura
The Clausura 2018 is the second championship of the season.

Regular season

Standings

Table

Group 1

Group 2

Positions by round
The table lists the positions of teams after each week of matches. In order to preserve chronological evolvements, any postponed matches are not included in the round at which they were originally scheduled, but added to the full round they were played immediately afterwards. For example, if a match is scheduled for matchday 13, but then postponed and played between days 16 and 17, it will be added to the standings for day 16.

Results

Top goalscorers
Players sorted first by goals scored, then by last name.

Source: Liga MX Femenil

Liguilla – Clausura

Bracket

Semifinals
First leg

Second leg

UANL won 4–2 on aggregate

Monterrey won 4–1 on aggregate

Finals
First leg

Second leg

4–4 on aggregate. UANL won on penalty kicks.

References

External links
 Official website of Liga MX Femenil

Liga MX Femenil
Mx
1